"Image of a Girl" is a song written by Richard Clasky and Marvin Rosenberg and performed by The Safaris featuring The Phantom's Band.  It reached #6 on the U.S. pop chart in 1960.

The song ranked #62 on Billboard magazine's Top 100 singles of 1960.

Other charting versions
Mark Wynter released a version of the song as a single in 1960 which reached #11 on the UK Singles Chart.
Nelson Keene released a version of the song as a single in 1960 which reached #37 on the UK Singles Chart.

Other versions
Otis Williams and the Charms released a version of the song as a single in 1960, but it did not chart.
Meredith MacRae featuring Candy Johnson's Exciters released a version of the song as a single in 1964 entitled "Image of a Boy", but it did not chart.
The Torquays released a version of the song as a single in 1965, but it did not chart.
The Deep Six released a version of the song as a single in 1966, but it did not chart.

References

1960 songs
1960 debut singles
1964 singles
1965 singles
1966 singles
Liberty Records singles
King Records (United States) singles